The 1998–99 North West Counties Football League season was the 17th in the history of the North West Counties Football League, a football competition in England. Teams were divided into two divisions: Division One and Division Two.

Division One 

Division One featured five new teams:

 Bootle, promoted as seventh place in Division Two
 Cheadle Town, promoted as fourth place in Division Two
 Leek CSOB, promoted as third place in Division Two
 Skelmersdale United, promoted as runners-up of Division Two
 Workington, relegated from the NPL Division One

League table

Division Two 

Division Two featured five new teams:

 Abbey Hey, joined from the Manchester League
 Chadderton, relegated from Division One
 Curzon Ashton, transferred from the Northern Counties East Football League
 Darwen, relegated from Division One
 Warrington Town, relegated from Division One

League table

Cup competitions

League Challenge Cup

Vauxhall GM beat Prescot Cables 1–0 in the final in a replay after the original match finished 1–1.

Floodlit Trophy

Clitheroe beat Kidsgrove Athletic 2–1 in the final.

Division Two Cup

Fleetwood Freeport beat Warrington Town 2–1 in the final.

References

 http://www.tonykempster.co.uk/archive98-99/nwc1.htm
 http://www.tonykempster.co.uk/archive98-99/nwc2.htm

External links 
 NWCFL Official Site

North West Counties Football League seasons
8